Nadiia Kodola (born 27 September 1988) is a  Ukrainian volleyball player.

She competed at the 2011 Women's European Volleyball Championship, 2013 CEV Volleyball European Championship, 2015 Summer Universiade, 2021 Women's European Volleyball Championship. 2021 Asian Women's Club Volleyball Championship, with Altay VC. and 2021 Women's European Volleyball League.

She played for Galychanka-TNEU-GADZ, Khimik Yuzhny, RC Cannes, Zhetysu, and Altay VC.

References 

Ukrainian women's volleyball players
1988 births
Living people